Jung Jong-yeon (born October 6, 1976) is a South Korean television producer and director. Jeong is best known for producing and directing the popular reality shows The Genius, Society Game and The Great Escape. He also directed on Korea's Got Talent.

He worked at CJ E&M (parent company of tvN, TVING) from 2011 to 2022, and in 2022 he left CJ E&M and moved to TEO, founded by fellow director Kim Tae-Ho.

Filmography
Ref:

As producer-director

Criticism/controversy

Plagiarism Issue

Jung Jong-yeon was criticized for plagiarism in Korea. In particular, his first hit, The Genius, had many similarities with the Japanese series Liar Game, and faced a lot of criticism for rip-off the Liar Game's own game and claiming that it was a game they made themselves.

Also he also apologized after it has been revealed that the ciphertext appeared in the Great Escape has copied the Linto's language from Japanese TV series Kamen Rider Kuuga.

Animal abuse
Jung Jong-yeon's TV show "Decoding Meow"() has been controversial for Adoption fraud, Speciesism and Breed Discrimination, animal abuse. As a result, Decoding Meow has broadcast only 6 episode and ended earlier.

Possible relation with the Nth room case
During early 2020, the Nth room case garnered national attention in South Korea. In April 2020 it was alleged by internet users that Jung Jong-yeon was one of the participants in the Nth Room.

References

Living people
1963 births
South Korean television producers
South Korean television directors